The 2023 Challenger Città di Lugano was a professional tennis tournament played on indoor hard courts. It was the 3rd edition of the tournament which was part of the 2023 ATP Challenger Tour. It took place in Lugano, Switzerland between 6 and 12 March 2023.

Singles main-draw entrants

Seeds

 1 Rankings are as of 27 February 2023.

Other entrants
The following players received wildcards into the singles main draw:
  Mika Brunold
  Pierre-Hugues Herbert
  Jakub Paul

The following player received entry into the singles main draw as an alternate:
  Raphaël Collignon

The following players received entry from the qualifying draw:
  Dan Added
  Marius Copil
  Calvin Hemery
  Cem İlkel
  Gauthier Onclin
  Vitaliy Sachko

Champions

Singles

 Otto Virtanen def.  Cem İlkel 6–4, 7–6(7–5).

Doubles

 Zizou Bergs /  David Pel def.  Constantin Frantzen /  Hendrik Jebens 6–2, 7–6(8–6).

References

2023 ATP Challenger Tour
March 2023 sports events in Switzerland
2023 in Swiss sport